Nneka Abulokwe, OBE (/ŋneka ˈabuːlɔːkwei/) is a British Nigerian tech and digital governance entrepreneur. She is one of the first Afro-Caribbean professionals in the UK to serve on the board of a leading European digital transformation organization, she is the founder and CEO of MicroMax Consulting. In 2019, she was honoured by Queen Elizabeth II as an Officer of the British Empire (OBE) for services to Business.

Early life and education 
Abulokwe was born in London to a Nigerian father and Jamaican mother and grew up in the city of Port Harcourt, Nigeria. In 1991, she obtained her BA degree in History from the University of Port Harcourt. She later obtained her MA degree at the University of London and a DBA degree from Cranfield University School of Management.

Career 
Abulokwe is an innovative technologist, digital governance entrepreneur and board director. She has over 25 years experience in the corporate world. She is the founder and CEO, MicroMax Consulting. In 2013, she joined the board/executive committee of Sopra Steria as an executive director. In 2017, Abulokwe became the Chair, Board Nomination Committee Information Systems Audit and Control Association (ISACA). As the chair of the board, she introduced the board nomination process by corporate governance activities. Abulokwe promoted diversity and leadership inclusion among the management of the organization. In 2020 she was appointed Non-Executive Director, University of Cambridge, on the Audit and Risk Committee and Non-Executive Director for Private Equity backed Davies Group. In 2022, Abulokwe was appointed Non-Executive Director to the group board of FTSE listed outsourcing and professional services company, Capita. She was also appointed Eternal Advisor, Global DE&I SteerCo, Shell plc.

Awards 
In 2019, Abulokwe was appointed an Officer of the Order of the British Empire (OBE) by Queen Elizabeth II for Services to Business. In 2018, she was ranked fourth in the Financial Times Top 100 Black Asian Minority Ethnic (BAME) Tech Leaders. She was also among the final list of Governance Professional of the Year 2018 Award by the Governance Institute. In 2019, 2020, 2021, 2022 Abulokwe was featured on the Power-list 100 as one of the most influential black business leaders, placing her among the UK's 100 most influential black people. Abulokwe was listed among the 100 most influential people of African and Caribbean origin in the UK.

References 

Officers of the Order of the British Empire
Living people
Year of birth missing (living people)
University of Port Harcourt alumni
Alumni of the University of London
Nigerian people in technology